"The Best of Me" is a rock song performed and composed by Canadian rock and pop artist Bryan Adams. released as the first track on Adams second compilation album, The Best of Me. The single was released in December, 1999 and became a hit single in Europe while ignored in the United States. "The Best of Me" peaked at 10 on the Canadian Singles Chart on 24 January 2000.

Track listings

CD single 1

CD single 2

Chart positions

Sources 

1999 singles
Bryan Adams songs
Songs written by Bryan Adams
A&M Records singles
Song recordings produced by Robert John "Mutt" Lange
1999 songs